Results from Norwegian football in 1999.

Men's football

League season

Tippeligaen

Play-off

IK Start promoted to Tippeligaen (agg. 3–2).

1. divisjon

2. divisjon

Norwegian Cup

Final

Women's football

League season

Women's top division (Toppserien)

Play-off to Women's top division (Toppserien)

Play-off group 1
October 3: Medkila – Larvik 1–2
October 9: Larvik – Voss 1–1
October 16: Voss – Medkila 0–0

Play-off group 2
October 2: Haugar – Byåsen 0–2
October 9: Byåsen – Liungen 4–0
October 16: Liungen – Haugar (Not played)

Women's first division

Group 1

Group 2

Group 3

Group 4

Group 5

Group 6

Promoted to first division:
Bingen
Kurland
Søgne
Vålerenga
Hinna
Rosendal
Djerv
Sogndal
Orkla
Stranda
Pioner

Men's UEFA competitions 1999/2000

Norwegian representatives
Rosenborg BK (UEFA Champions League)
Molde FK (UEFA Champions League)
Stabæk Fotball (UEFA Cup)
Viking FK (UEFA Cup)
Bodø/Glimt (UEFA Cup)
SK Brann (Intertoto Cup)
Vålerenga Fotball (Intertoto Cup)

UEFA Champions League

Second qualifying round

Third qualifying round

First group stage

Group C

Group E

Second group stage

Group C

UEFA Cup

Qualifying round

First round

Second round

Intertoto Cup

First round

Second round

National teams

Norway men's national football team

 

Note: Norway's goals first 
Explanation:
ECQ = UEFA Euro 2000 qualifier

Norway women's national football team

 

Note: Norway's goals first 
Explanation:
ECQ = UEFA Women's Euro 2001 qualifier

External links
 RSSSF Norway

 
Seasons in Norwegian football